Deebo Bhattacharya also known as Debu Bhattacherjee was a Pakistani-Bangladeshi musician, painter and singer who worked in Lollywood movies during the era of 1960s and 1970s. He was one of the well known composers in Bangladesh as well. He is known for composing the classic song, "Bare bemurawat hein ye husn walay kahein dil laganay ki koshish na karna" for the film Badnaam (1966). After 1971, he became a citizen of Bangladesh.  He was awarded Ekushey Padak in 1976 by the Government of Bangladesh. He earned the first ever Bangladesh National Film Award for Best Music Director for Choritrohin (1975) jointly with Lokman Hossain Fakir. He was conferred Ekushey Padak posthumus in 1997 for his lifetime contribution to Bengali music.

Early life and career
Deebo was born into a Bengali Hindu family. He arrived in Pakistan from India in 1956 to work as an assistant to Indian music director Timir Baran who was going to compose music for the film Anokhi. While Timir Baran moved back to India after composing for a few Pakistani films, Deebo remained in Pakistan and resided in Karachi.

In 1957, his first film as a solo music director,Maska Polish, was released. The movie was a box office disappointment. The same fate befell his next two movies, Yeh Duniya (1960) and Lakhoun Fasane (1961). 
With the release of Banjaran (1962), he rose to notoriety, and the song "Na jane kaisa safar hai mera", sung by Noor Jehan, became a hit. The other milestone of Deebo's career was the film Badnaam (1966). One of its songs, "Bare Bemurawat Hain Yei Husn Waale, Kahin Dil Lagane Ko Koshish Na Karna", vocalized by Suraiya Multanikar, is considered one of his most timeless tunes.
In 1968, he composed songs for producer Waheed Murad's film Sumandar including the theme song, "Tera Mera Sathi Hai Lehrata Sumandar".

In the 1960s and 1970s, he composed music for several other films, including; Shararat (1963), Beti (1964), Taqdeer (1966), Meray Bachay Meri Ankhen (1967), Bahadur (1967), Jhuk Gaya Aasman (1970), and Tiger Gang (1974).

Popular compositions

discography

Later life and death
Deebo moved to Bangladesh after the separation of East Pakistan in 1971. He died in 1994, according after living for nearly two decades there.

Awards
 Ekushey Padak (1997)
 National Film Award (1976)

References

1994 deaths
Pakistani composers
Pakistani film score composers
Bangladeshi composers
Bangladeshi film score composers
Pakistani people of Bengali descent
1930 births
Bangladeshi painters
Recipients of the Ekushey Padak
Best Music Director National Film Award (Bangladesh) winners